Lygephila victoria is a species of moth in the family Erebidae. It is found in North America.

References

Further reading

 
 
 

Toxocampinae
Articles created by Qbugbot
Moths described in 1874